Roll On Mississippi is the twenty-eighth studio album by American country music artist Charley Pride. It was released in March 1981 via RCA Records and contained ten tracks. It was co-produced by Pride and Jerry Bradley. Roll On Mississippi was Pride's twenty eighth studio album in his career and included two major hits: "You Almost Slipped My Mind" and the title track. The album itself would also reach a peak position on the American country music chart following its release.

Background and content
Charley Pride was able to continue having commercial country music success by adapting his style to a more contemporary country pop. Beginning in the middle 1970s, his music began to reflect this in hits like "She's Just an Old Love Turned Memory," and "Where Do I Put Her Memory." This country pop style continued into the 1980s with albums including Roll On Mississippi. The project was co-produced by Pride himself and his most recent collaborator, Jerry Bradley. The album was recorded at the Music City Music Hall studio, located in Nashville, Tennessee. Most of the recording took place in December 1980. It contained a total of ten tracks. Many of the record's tracks contained string instrumentation and arrangements, such as the songs "He Can Be an Angel" and "Taking the Easy Way Out." In addition, Pride chose songs that had been composed by songwriters he had used for previous albums. This included Ben Peters, John Schweers and Troy Seals.

Release and reception

Roll On Mississippi was released in March 1981 on RCA Records. It would mark Pride's twenty-eighth studio collection. It was originally released as both a vinyl LP and a cassette. It would later be issued in the 2010s in a digital format, that was available to music download and streaming services, including Apple Music. The album spent a total of 17 weeks on the Billboard Top Country Albums chart and peaked at number 17 by May 1981. The album would later receive a rating of three stars from Allmusic. Two singles were included on the project. The first was "You Almost Slipped My Mind," which was issued as a single in September 1980. It spent 18 weeks on the Billboard Hot Country Songs chart and reached number four by the end of the year. Its second single was the title track, released in February 1981. Spending 13 weeks on the Billboard country chart, it peaked at number seven by the spring of 1981. Both singles would also reach the top ten of the RPM Country Singles chart in Canada.

Track listings

Vinyl and cassette versions

Digital version

Personnel
All credits are adapted from the liner notes of Roll On Mississippi.

Musical and technical personnel
 Jerry Bradley – producer
 Herb Burnette – art direction
 Dan Dea – engineer
 Bill Harris – engineer
 The Jordanaires – background vocals
 Randy Kling – mastering
 The Shelly Kurland Strings – strings
 The Nashville Edition – background vocals
 Charley Pride – lead vocals, producer
 Nick Sangiamo – photography
 Pinwheel Studios – art direction
 Bergen White – arrangement

Chart performance

Release history

References

1981 albums
Albums produced by Jerry Bradley (music executive)
Albums produced by Charley Pride
Charley Pride albums
RCA Records albums